Hippichthys heptagonus, the belly pipefish, is a species of freshwater pipefish of the family Syngnathidae. It is found from Kenya and South Africa to the Solomon Islands, and from southern Japan to New South Wales. It is a demersal species, living in the lower parts of rivers and streams, estuary habitats such as mangroves and tidal creeks, and occasionally in large lakes. It feeds on small crustaceans, such as copepods and cladocerans, as well as dipteran and ephemopteran larvae. This species is ovoviviparous, with females depositing eggs on the males, who in turn give birth to live young several weeks later.

Identification

Hippichthys heptagonus can be recognized by its brownish colour, alternating dark and light bands along the back and sides, black stripe on the snout, and black bands radiating from the eye.

References

Further reading
Encyclopedia of Life
IUCN Seahorse, Pipefish & Stickleback Specialist Group

Fish described in 1849
heptagonus
Freshwater fish